The Great British Baking Show (season 2) may refer to:

 The Great British Bake Off (series 2)
 The Great British Bake Off (series 4), which was broadcast as the second second of the series on PBS in the United States

See also
 The Great British Baking Show (season 4) (disambiguation)